Kathleen Mary Smith (16 October 1915 – 20 July 1993) was an Australian cricketer. Smith played six Test matches for the Australia national women's cricket team.

Smith was the sixth woman to play test cricket for Australia.

The Kath Smith Medal is named after Smith. It is awarded to the "best and fairest" women cricketer in Brisbane Grade Cricket. Cricket players who have won the medal include Melissa Bulow, Jude Coleman, Jess Jonassen and Delissa Kimmince

References

1915 births
1993 deaths
Australia women Test cricketers